For God and Country is the eighth studio album by American country music artist Jan Howard. The album was released in January 1970 on Decca Records and was produced by Owen Bradley. Although the album did not feature any singles, it was Howard's first record of patriotic music. It was recorded as a tribute to the United States Armed Forces fighting in the Vietnam War and was also a tribute to Howard's two sons who were in the military.

Background and content
For God and Country was recorded at Bradley's Barn, located in Nashville, Tennessee. The album was recorded in September 1969 and was produced by Owen Bradley. Howard had been collaborating with Bradley since signing with the Decca label in the 1960s. The album consisted of 11 tracks. Some of album's material had been recorded by other artists. This included the songs "How Great Thou Art", "Old Rugged Cross" and "God Bless America Again". Also included were compositions written by Howard herself, such as the opening track. Additionally, her son, Carter Howard, composed a track for the album entitled "I Am".

Howard recorded For God and Country as a tribute to the United States Armed Forces fighting in the Vietnam War. It was also a tribute to her sons fighting in the war, notably her son, Jimmy Howard. Jimmy had been killed during his service in 1968. The liner notes featured comments written by some of Howard's friends. This included comments from artists Bill Anderson and Bobby Bare.

The album was released in January 1970 via Decca Records. The album was released in a vinyl record format, featuring 6 songs on one side and 5 on the other side of the record.

Track listing

Personnel
 Bill Anderson – liner notes
 Bobby Bare – liner notes
 Owen Bradley – producer
 Jan Howard – lead vocals, background vocals

Release history

References

1970 albums
Jan Howard albums
Albums produced by Owen Bradley
Decca Records albums